is a city located in Fukuoka Prefecture, Japan, part of the greater Fukuoka metropolitan area.  Nearby cities include Ōnojō and Chikushino. Although mostly mountainous, it does have arable land used for paddy fields and market gardening. As of October 2018, the city has an estimated population of 72,231 with 29,355 households and a population density of 2,440 persons per km². The total area is 29.58 km².

The city was officially founded on April 1, 1982, although it has been important historically for more than a thousand years. It was an administrative capital of Fukuoka at around 663 CE.

History
Dazaifu was the imperial office governing Kyūshū (corresponding to Tagajō in Tōhoku) after it was moved from present-day Fukuoka City in 663.

According to the Taiho Code of 701, an attempt by the Yamato state to exert further control over its territories, Dazaifu was given two principal administrative functions: to supervise the affairs of Tsukushi (present-day Kyushu) and to receive foreign emissaries. Dazaifu hosted foreign embassies from China and Korea. Kōrokan, a guesthouse for foreign embassies, was also established. The Korokan featured in contemporary literature, such as the Man'yōshū, as a place of departure for ocean voyages.

From the Nara period through the Heian period and until the Kamakura period, Dazaifu was one of the military and administrative centers of Japan.

Government records indicate that the disastrous Japanese smallpox epidemic that took place from 735 to 737 first took hold in Dazaifu.

In the Heian period, Dazaifu was a place of exile for high-ranking courtiers. Nobles exiled there include Sugawara no Michizane. His grave is at Dazaifu Tenman-gū.

Dazaifu was sometimes attacked by rebels. At other times the head of Dazaifu himself raised a rebellion. In 739 the powerful nobleman Fujiwara Hirotsugu was appointed to Dazaifu. He soon organised a rebellion, raising 15,000 men. After three months, the uprising was suppressed by 17,000 court troops. In 939 another nobleman, Fujiwara Sumitomo, rebelled against the court. Allying himself with pirates, in 941 he landed in Kyushu. Then he defeated the troops guarding Dazaifu and burned the state buildings. Due to this and other developments, Dazaifu never regained its earlier prestige.

With the invasions of the Mongols and the decline of imperial authority, Dazaifu became less politically significant. In the Muromachi period the political center of Kyūshū was moved to Hakata.

In medieval times, Dazaifu was the base of the Shōni clan. The Shōni were later expelled by the Ōuchi clan.

In the Edo period, Dazaifu was a part of the Kuroda han until its abolition in 1873.

Geography

Climate
Dazaifu has a humid subtropical climate (Köppen: Cfa).

Demographics
Per Japanese census data, the population of Dazaifu in 2020 is 73,164 people. Dazaifu has been conducting censuses since 1920.

Attractions

The Kyushu National Museum opened on October 16, 2005. A wood and glass building in a hilly landscape, it hosts collections of Japanese artifacts related to the history of Kyūshū.

Kōmyōzen-ji is a Zen temple famous for its stone garden. It was built during the Kamakura period just next to Dazaifu Tenman-gū. Another temple, Kanzeon-ji, was built in the 8th century. It was once the chief Buddhist temple on Kyūshū and houses a number of historical, artistic, and religious treasures. All three are within walking distance of Nishitetsu Dazaifu Station.

The ruins of the medieval Dazaifu Administrative Buildings, also located within walking distance of Dazaifu Station, are today a public park.

There is small museum about Sugawara no Michizane, who died in exile in Dazaifu in 903.

The Starbucks coffeeshop in Dazaifu has a unique design by Kengo Kuma.

Education
There are several universities in the city:
Chikushi Jogakuen University
Fukuoka International University
Fukuoka University of Economics
Fukuoka Social Medical Welfare University

For a time there was a junior college:
Aso Fukuoka Junior College (1989–1999)

Area primary and junior high schools are administered by the Dazaifu Board of Education.
 Dazaifu Minami Elementary School
 Dazaifu Higashi Elementary School
 Dazaifu Nishi Elementary School
 Dazaifu Elementary School
 Mizuki Nishi Elementary School
 Mizuki Elementary School
 Kokubu Elementary School
 Gakugyouin Junior High School
 Dazaifu Higashi Junior High School
 Dazaifu Nishi Junior High School
 Dazaifu Junior High School

The prefecture operates senior high schools
 Chikushidai High School
 Fukuoka Prefectural Dazaifu High School

See also
Dazaifu (government)
Dazaifu Line
Tofurōminami Station

Notes

References
 Nussbaum, Louis-Frédéric and Käthe Roth. (2005).  Japan encyclopedia. Cambridge: Harvard University Press. ;  OCLC 58053128

External links

 Dazaifu City official website 
 Dazaifu page of official Fukuoka Prefecture Tourism Association website
 Kyushu National Museum official web site 
English guidemap

 
Cities in Fukuoka Prefecture
Planned cities in Japan
1982 establishments in Japan
Populated places established in 1982